Sancho Dávila Toledo (Sancho de Avila) (Ávila, Old Castile, 1546, – Plasencia, Cáceres, 6 or 7 December 1625) was a Spanish bishop. He was of a distinguished family, and known as a learned preacher.

Life
He made his ecclesiastical studies and received his doctorate at the University of Salamanca. He was afterwards consecrated bishop and was, at different times, bishop of Cartagena, bishop of Jaen in Andalusia, bishop of Siguenza in Old Castile, in 1615, and, seven years later, bishop of Plasencia, where he remained until his death. He had been a confessor of Theresa of Avila.

Works
His works in Spanish include:

"The Veneration Due to the Bodies and Relics of Saints" (Madrid, 1611); 
"Sermons" (Baeza, 1615); 
"The Sighs of St. Augustine", from the Latin (Madrid, 1601, 1626); 
and, in manuscript, the Lives of Augustine of Hippo  and Thomas Aquinas.

References

External links and additional sources
 (for Chronology of Bishops) 
 (for Chronology of Bishops) 
 (for Chronology of Bishops) 
 (for Chronology of Bishops) 
 (for Chronology of Bishops) 
 (for Chronology of Bishops) 
 (for Chronology of Bishops)  
 (for Chronology of Bishops) 
Attribution

1546 births
1625 deaths
Bishops of Cartagena
Bishops of Jaén
Bishops of Sigüenza
University of Salamanca alumni
Academic staff of the University of Salamanca